The Kaiser 25 is an American trailerable sailboat that was designed by John R. Kaiser Sr. as a cruiser and first built in 1962.

Production
The design was built by Plastic Fabricators, Inc. of Wilmington, Delaware under contract to Kaiser Yachts/Stowman Shipbuilding in the United States from 1962 until about 1964, but it is now out of production.

Design
The Kaiser 25 is a recreational keelboat, built predominantly of fiberglass, with wood trim. It has a masthead sloop rig; a spooned, raked stem; a raised counter, angled transom; a keel-mounted rudder controlled by a tiller and a fixed long keel. It displaces  and carries  of lead ballast.

The design has sleeping accommodation for four people, with a double "V"-berth in the bow cabin and two straight settee berths in the main cabin. The galley is located on both sides of the companionway ladder, with the sink on the port side and the ice box on the starboard. The head is located in the bow cabin under the "V"-berth.

Operational history
In a 2010 review Steve Henkel wrote, "in his sales brochure, Kaiser says that 'it is the intention of the designer to produce a small, able, and comfortable cruising-racing sloop of superior quality in every detail.' The brochure also states that while the entire hull and deck is normally plastic, a superstructure (presumably meaning deck and cabin house) of wood is available at owner's option, and that various changes in the accommodations plan could also be made 'at a slight extra cost.' An outboard well with watertight plug was standard; inboard power was available at a cost, depending on make and model. Best features: This looks like a high-quality product for its day. Worst features: None discovered."

See also
List of sailing boat types

References

Keelboats
1960s sailboat type designs
Sailing yachts
Trailer sailers
Sailboat type designs by John R. Kaiser Sr.
Sailboat types built by Plastic Fabricators, Inc.